The California Labor and Workforce Development Agency (LWDA) is a cabinet-level California state agency that coordinates workforce programs by overseeing seven major departments dealing with benefit administration, enforcement of California labor laws, appellate functions related to employee benefits, workforce development, tax collection, economic development activities. It was conceived by Governor Gray Davis and was formally created by S.B. 1236 in 2002.

Organization 

The agency oversees multiple departments and programs:

 California Agricultural Labor Relations Board administers the California Agricultural Labor Relations Act, which establishes collective bargaining for farmworkers.
 Employment Development Department administers unemployment insurance (UI), disability insurance (DI), and paid family leave (PFL) programs.
 Unemployment Insurance Appeals Board is a quasi-judicial administrative court which hears appeals from determinations on unemployment insurance (UI) claims and taxes by the Employment Development Department.
 California Public Employment Relations Board
 California Workforce Development Board
 California Department of Industrial Relations
 Employment Training Panel

See also 
 United States Department of Labor

References 

 

Labor and Workforce Development Agency
State departments of labor of the United States
Government agencies established in 2003
2003 establishments in California